Vellinakshatram is a 1949 Indian Malayalam-language feature film directed by Felix J. Beyse and produced by Udaya Pictures. Starring Gayaka Peethambaram, Miss Kumari, Lalitha Devi, Alleppey Vincent, Kandiyoor Parameshwaran Pillai and Baby Girija. It was the first production of Udaya Pictures. It had music composed by B. A. Chidambaranath, who debuted with this film.

Vellinakshatram is the 4th release among Malayalam language films.

Cast

Miss Kumari
Alleppey Vincent
Gayaka Peethambaram
Cherai Ambujam
Kuttanadu Ramakrishna Pillai
Lalitha devi
Kandiyoor Parameshwaran Pillai
Cherayi Ambujam
Baby Girija

Trivia

No material from this film, print or gramophone recording, is available today except for its accompanying songbook. At the time of its release, it performed poorly at the box office.

References

External links
 
 Vellinakshatram at the Malayalam Movie Database

1949 films
1940s Malayalam-language films
Indian black-and-white films